Khan Verdi (also Romanized as Khān Verdī) is a village in Zhan Rural District, in the Central District of Dorud County, Lorestan Province, Iran. At the 2006 census, its population was 127, in 23 families.

References 

Towns and villages in Dorud County